The 15717 / 18 Guwahati–Mariani Junction Intercity Express is an Express train belonging to Northeast Frontier Railway zone of Indian Railways that runs between  and  in India.

It operates as train number 15717 from Guwahati to Mariani Junction and as train number 15718 in the reverse direction, serving the states of  Assam.

Coaches
The 15717 / 18 Guwahati–Mariani Junction Intercity Express has nine general unreserved & two SLR (seating with luggage rake) coaches. It does not carry a pantry car.

As is customary with most train services in India, coach composition may be amended at the discretion of Indian Railways depending on demand.

Service

Routing

Traction
As the route is going to electrification, a -based WDM-3D diesel locomotive pulls the train to its destination.

References

External links
15717 Intercity Express at India Rail Info
15718 Intercity Express at India Rail Info

Intercity Express (Indian Railways) trains
Rail transport in Assam
Transport in Guwahati
Transport in Jorhat